Formula One, abbreviated to F1, is the highest class of open-wheeled auto racing defined by the Fédération Internationale de l'Automobile (FIA), motorsport's world governing body. The "formula" in the name refers to a set of rules to which all participants and cars must conform. The World Constructors' Championship is presented by the FIA to the most successful F1 constructor over the course of the season through a points system based on individual Grand Prix results. Constructors' Championship points are calculated by adding points scored in each race by any driver for that constructor. From the inaugural season of the World Constructors' Championship in  up until the  season only the highest-scoring driver in each race for each constructor contributed points towards the World Constructors' Championship (then officially as the International Cup for Formula One Constructors ); since  the  season points from all cars entered by each constructor have counted towards their championship total. The Constructors' Championship is won when it is no longer mathematically possible for another constructor to overtake another's points total regardless of the outcome of the remaining races, although it is not officially awarded until the FIA Prize Giving Ceremony held in various cities following the conclusion of the season.

In  this name was officially changed to the World Constructors' Championship. Out of the 170 chassis constructors that have entered an F1 Grand Prix, a total of 15 have won the Championship in its 63 seasons. Ferrari holds the record for the highest number of World Constructors' Championships victories, having won the title on 16 occasions. Williams is in second position with nine Constructors' Championships and McLaren and Mercedes are in third with eight titles. With 16 titles, Ferrari has amassed the highest amount of Constructors' Championships as an engine manufacturer, followed by Renault, Ford, Mercedes and Honda with twelve, ten, ten and six titles, respectively. All but 17 titles (16 titles won by Italian-built Ferrari chassis and 1 title won by French-built Matra chassis) have been won by chassis that were designed and constructed in the United Kingdom. On eleven occasions, the World Constructors' Champion team has not contained the World Drivers' Champion for that season. All titles but one  (in  Matra cars entered by Ken Tyrrell's privateer team Matra International) have been won by cars that were entered by works teams. Among drivers that have contributed with at least a single point to the constructors' title, Lewis Hamilton has contributed to the most with eight constructors' titles, all of them with Mercedes.

By season

By chassis constructor
Constructors in bold are competing in the 2023 World Championship.

By engine manufacturer
Engine manufacturers in bold are competing in the 2023 World Championship.

By tyres used
Tyre manufacturers in bold are competing in the 2023 World Championship.

Consecutive titles

By chassis constructor
There have been nine constructors who have achieved consecutive wins in the World Constructors' Championship. Of those, only Ferrari and Williams have won four sets of consecutive Formula One World Constructors' Championships.

Constructors in bold are competing in the 2023 World Championship.

By engine manufacturer

Manufacturers in bold are competing in the 2023 World Championship.

See also
 List of Formula One World Drivers' Champions
 List of Formula One World Championship points scoring systems
 List of Formula One constructors
 List of Formula One engine manufacturers

References

External links
 Formula One official website
 FIA official website

World Champions Constructors

Formula One